The Georgian Armed Forces mutiny of October 1998 was an abortive attempt of a rebellion organized by a group of officers led by Colonel Akaki Eliava in western Georgia against the government of President Eduard Shevardnadze.

The mutiny had its roots in the Georgian civil war of 1991–1993. Akaki Eliava, a leader of the revolt, was among the most active supporters of the late president Zviad Gamsakhurdia, who was ousted in a coup in 1992 and defeated in a subsequent attempt to regain power in 1993. Eliave was arrested, but later granted amnesty and he rejoined Georgia’s armed forces.

On October 18, 1998, approximately 200 Georgian soldiers led by Eliava left their barracks at the town of Senaki in western Georgia and marched on Kutaisi, the second largest city in the country. The government forces under the personal command of Defense Minister David Tevzadze intercepted the rebels before reaching the city. Next day, after a brief shootout which left at least one rebel dead, the mutineers agreed to return to their barracks. 31 rebels were arrested, but Colonel Eliava and his 30 followers escaped.

Sources 
 "Georgian mutiny collapses", BBC News, October 20, 1998.
 Lee, R. "Georgian Military (Senaki) Revolt of 1998"

Military history of Georgia (country)
Georgian Attempted Mutiny, 1998
Conflicts in 1998
Mutinies
October 1998 events in Asia